Richard Rivers may refer to:

 Richard H. Rivers, American educator
 Richard Godfrey Rivers (1859–1925), English artist, active in Australia

See also
 Dick Rivers (1945–2019), French singer and actor
 Richard Rives (1895–1982), American lawyer and judge